Hottest Girl in the World is a song by English boy band JLS, released as the official lead, and second overall, single from the group's fourth studio album, Evolution. The track was released on 21 October 2012. The track is a preview of the band's new-style material, which focuses on stronger harmonies and stripped back British R&B. The song was written by the band, along with Dwayne Abernathy, Ali Tennant and Bangladesh, the latter of whom produced the track.

Background
The track received its official radio premiere was on The Chris Moyles Show on BBC Radio 1 on 6 September 2012. Shortly after, the band's official YouTube account uploaded a short audio snippet of the track, followed by an unofficial lyric video.

Live performances
JLS performed the song live on The X Factor on 21 October 2012, as well as Alan Carr: Chatty Man on 26 October 2012.

Critical reception
Jon Stickler of Stereoboard.com described the song as "a sleek, modern club song, showing maturity and progression, which takes the group out of pop territory."

Music video
The music video for the track premiered on JLS's official YouTube account on 10 September 2012. The video features the band dressed in black and white outfits, performing choreographed routines throughout the video, alongside backing dancers.

Track listing
 Digital download
 "Hottest Girl in the World" - 3:39
 "Hottest Girl in the World" (Andi Durrant & Steve More Radio Edit) - 4:08
 "Hottest Girl in the World" (Bless Beats Remix) [featuring Dominique Young Unique] - 4:02
 "Hottest Girl in the World" (DJ Fricktion Remix) - 3:57

 CD single
 "Hottest Girl in the World" - 3:39
 "Hottest Girl in the World" (Andi Durrant & Steve More Radio Edit) - 4:08

Charts

Weekly charts

Year-end charts

References

2012 singles
JLS songs
2012 songs
Songs written by Ali Tennant
Epic Records singles
Songs written by Diplo
Songs written by Dem Jointz
Songs written by Bangladesh (record producer)
Song recordings produced by Bangladesh (record producer)